The Beaufort County School District educates nearly 22,000 students in Beaufort County, South Carolina, United States. It is the second fastest-growing county in the state.

It serves all parts of the county for grades K-12 except for those living on the property of Marine Corps Air Station Beaufort, which are zoned to Department of Defense Education Activity (DoDEA) for schools for grades Pre-Kindergarten-8. However Beaufort County Schools does serve the MCAS Beaufort property for high school, and in sum has the highest number of students, of any school system, affiliated with MCAS Beaufort.

The district manages five early childhood centers, 17 elementary schools, seven middle schools, and five high schools.  The district shares operating responsibility of the Beaufort-Jasper Academy for Career Excellence (along with the Jasper County School District) and sponsored the charter for Riverview Charter School, a K-8 facility that opened in 2009. The district also sponsors an Adult Education alternative school where students above the age of 17 can earn a diploma or GED in both virtual and traditional settings.

The superintendent is Dr. Frank Rodriguez, who began the role in July 2019. The district is governed by an 11-member board of education of elected members who represent the electoral district in which they live and serve staggered, four-year terms.

Academics
According to data released by the South Carolina Department of Education, the Beaufort County School District earned a "B" letter grade for the 2012–2013 school year, exceeding academic expectations put forth by the state in standardized testing and graduation retention.  The district received an "average" score on the Absolute Rating and a "good" score in the Growth Rating metrics on its 2012 state report card.

The majority of the district's schools are accredited with the Southern Association of Colleges and Schools.

List of schools

High schools
 Battery Creek High School
 Beaufort High School
 Bluffton High school
 Hilton Head Island High School
 May River High School
 Whale Branch Early College High School

Middle schools
 Beaufort Middle School
 H.E. McCracken Middle School
 Hilton Head Island Middle School
 Lady's Island Middle School
 Robert Smalls Middle School
 Whale Branch Middle School
 Bluffton Middle School

Elementary schools
 Beaufort Elementary School
 Bluffton Elementary School
 Broad River Elementary School
 Coosa Elementary School
 Daufuskie Elementary School
 Hilton Head Island Elementary School
 Hilton Head Island School for the Creative Arts
 Joseph Shanklin Elementary School
 Lady's Island Elementary School
 Michael C. Riley Elementary School
 Mossy Oaks Elementary School
 Okatie Elementary School
 Port Royal Elementary School
 Pritchardville Elementary School
 Red Cedar Elementary School
 Saint Helena Elementary School
 Whale Branch Elementary School

Academies (preK-8 schools)

 River Ridge Academy
 Robert Smalls International Academy

Early childhood centers
 Bluffton Early Childhood Center
 Hilton Head Island Early Childhood Center
 James J. Davis Early Childhood Center
 Michael C. Riley Early Childhood Center
 Saint Helena Early Learning Center

Charter schools
 Riverview Charter School (K-8)

Other schools
 Beaufort County Adult Education
 Beaufort-Jasper Academy for Career Excellence (9-12)

Closed schools
 James J. Davis Elementary School
 Shell Point Elementary School

Specific schools and programs

Beaufort County Adult Education
Beaufort County Adult Education is an alternative school within the Beaufort County School District. Students over the age of seventeen can complete coursework for their South Carolina high school diploma or study for the GED examination. The program also offers classes through South Carolina Virtual Schools.

Joseph Shanklin Elementary School
In October 1901, the school started with seven pupils. By January 1905, 150 students attended. It was founded by a group of northern abolitionists and Beaufort citizens. The school's mission was to instruct African American students in better cultivation of land, care of stock and manner of living. The school offered instruction in carpentry, bricklaying, printing and other trades. Courses for girls included cooking, sewing, nursing, and homemaking. By 1920 The Port Royal Agricultural School became the Beaufort County Training School, but it was still known as The Shanklin School by area residents. With public and private funds it was able to meet the need for African American teachers, and was known as a teacher's training site. The school maintained  of land, as well as two barns, two dormitories, a power plant, equipment and an endowment of around $11,000. Today, the school is found at 121 Morrall Drive.

Mossy Oaks Elementary School
The school opened in 1962. The school has met federal AYP (adequate yearly progress) since its initiation, and has been a Title One school for the past two years. The principal is Donald Gruel.  The school serves students from PK to fifth grade, has one resource class, and one self contained classroom for students with special needs. Mossy Oaks is one of South Carolina's newly named "Red Carpet" schools by the State Department of Education.

References

External links
 Beaufort County School District website
 2012 District Report Card (South Carolina Department of Education)

School districts in South Carolina
Education in Beaufort County, South Carolina